Aulacodes psyllalis is a moth in the family Crambidae. It was described by Achille Guenée in 1854. It is found in Venezuela and Brazil.

References

Acentropinae
Moths described in 1854
Moths of South America